The Rail Passengers Association (RPA), formerly the National Association of Railroad Passengers (NARP), is the largest advocacy organization for rail passengers in the United States.

Early history 
The organization was founded by Anthony Haswell on May 18, 1967, to lobby for the continuation of passenger trains in the United States.

Activities 
RPA's small paid staff in Washington, D.C., spends most of its time educating members of Congress and their staffs about the value of passenger rail.

RPA publishes a newsletter eleven times a year detailing news in the passenger rail world.  It often includes stories about related legislation in Congress, Traveler's Advisories, and Travel Tips, with a particular focus on Amtrak.

Members benefit from discounts on Amtrak, Via Rail, Alaska Railroad, Grand Canyon Railway, Nevada Northern Railway, and Brightline.

Organization 
The governing body of RPA is the Council of Representatives, consisting of 112 members from fifty states plus the District of Columbia, apportioned by the number of RPA members in each state. Up to an additional ten "At-Large" Council Representatives may hold office at any one time.

RPA is divided into ten regional divisions, each headed by a Division Leader, who is also a Council Representative for one of the states included in his/her Division.

Council Representatives and Division Leaders report to a liaison on the Board of Directors. The Board of Directors includes one Chair, four Vice Chairs, one Secretary, one Treasurer, and eight Directors, for a total of fifteen members. The immediate past Chair and Treasurer hold non-voting, ex-officio, advisory roles on the Board. The Board sets the agenda for RPA's activities and the hiring of staff.

In addition to the elected leadership, the small paid staff in Washington, D.C. includes a President, Vice Presidents for Policy, Operations, and Resource Development, Directors for Policy Research and Customer Advisory Committee Services, two regional Field Coordinators (based in Massachusetts and Alabama), and an Office Manager.

Jim Mathews, formerly Executive Editor of the Aviation Week Intelligence Network, has served as RPA President and CEO since August 2014.

References

External links 
 

Amtrak
Passenger rail transportation in the United States
Non-profit organizations based in Washington, D.C.
Political advocacy groups in the United States
Organizations established in 1967
Rail advocacy organizations in the United States